The Chain of Guilt (German:Die Kette der Schuld) is a 1921 German silent film directed by Franz Osten.

Cast
In alphabetical order
 Viktor Gehring as Matthes Sutter, Pelzjäger
 Fritz Greiner as Robert Wit
 Eugen Gura as Bankier Torn
 Violetta Napierska as Ethel Torn  
 Henri Peters-Arnolds as Harry

References

Bibliography
 Sanjit Narwekar. Directory of Indian film-makers and films. Flicks Books, 1994.

External links

1921 films
Films of the Weimar Republic
Films directed by Franz Osten
German silent feature films
German black-and-white films